The 1970 Dartmouth Indians football team represented Dartmouth College during the 1970 NCAA University Division football season. The Indians were led by 16th-year head coach Bob Blackman and played their home games at Memorial Field in Hanover, New Hampshire. They finished with a perfect record of 9–0, winning the Ivy League title and the Lambert-Meadowlands Trophy, which signified them as champions of the East. Dartmouth finished ranked 14th in both major polls, their first ranked finish since 1943 and the last time an Ivy League school was ranked in the final AP Poll.

Schedule

Roster

References

Dartmouth
Dartmouth Big Green football seasons
Ivy League football champion seasons
Lambert-Meadowlands Trophy seasons
College football undefeated seasons
Dartmouth Indians football